Adam Sahaba railway station (Urdu and  ) is located in Adam Sahaba town, in the Rahim Yar Khan district of Punjab, a province of Pakistan.

See also
 List of railway stations in Pakistan
 Pakistan Railways

References

Railway stations in Rahim Yar Khan District
Railway stations on Karachi–Peshawar Line (ML 1)